Kombi may refer to:

 Battle of Kombi, a 1647 battle between Ndongo-Matamba (assisted by the Dutch) and the Portuguese
 Kombi, a Japanese term for a comedy duo
 Kombi (band), a Polish pop rock band
 Kombini, a type of Japanese convenience store
 Volkswagen Type 2 or Kombi, a panel van introduced in 1950
 Izh 2125 or Kombi, a  compact car produced by the Soviet Union
 Kombi, Iran, a village in Razavi Khorasan Province, Iran
 A term for a minibus in South Africa
 Kombi, a type of minivan taxis in Zimbabwe, similar to marshrutkas in Eastern Europe. 
 Kütahya Kombi Servisi - Kombi ve beyaz eşya teknik servis hizmeti veren bir firma

See also
 Combi (disambiguation)
 Kombo (disambiguation)